Wilmer Lanier Barrow (July 26, 1903 – August 29, 1975) was an American electrical engineer, inventor, teacher, industrial manager, and  a counselor to government agencies. He obtained a BSEE degree in 1926 from Louisiana State University, and a doctorate from the Technical University of Munich in 1931.  During the pre-World War 2 development of radar at Massachusetts Institute of Technology, Barrow performed research on microwaves, inventing waveguide in 1936 and the horn antenna in 1938.

He was vice president for research, development and engineering of the Sperry Rand Corporation.

He was elected to the grade of Fellow in the IEEE in 1941, and a Fellow of the American Academy of Arts and Sciences in 1942. In 1943 he received the IEEE Morris N. Liebmann Memorial Award In 1966 he received the IEEE Edison Medal For a career of meritorious achievement-innovating, teaching and developing means for transmission of electromagnetic energy at microwave frequencies. He was a member of Sigma Xi.

References

1903 births
1975 deaths
American electrical engineers
Fellow Members of the IEEE
Fellows of the American Academy of Arts and Sciences
IEEE Edison Medal recipients
20th-century American engineers
Microwave engineers